The following events occurred in October 1926:

Friday, October 1, 1926
English pilot Alan Cobham landed his de Havilland seaplane on the River Thames to complete a 28,000-mile flight from England to Australia and back.

Saturday, October 2, 1926

Air Union Blériot 155 caught fire and crashed at Leigh, Kent, killing all seven aboard. It was the first in-flight fire in airline history.
Józef Piłsudski became Prime Minister of Poland.
The drama film The Ice Flood opened.

Sunday, October 3, 1926
Father Charles Coughlin began his weekly sermons on station WJR in Detroit.

Monday, October 4, 1926
9,000 coal miners ended their labour dispute and returned to work in Britain, as reports appeared with increasing regularity of miners' representatives making local settlements with pit owners. Over 170,000 miners had gone back to work by this time. 
The Mexican rebellion spread to southern Guanajuato as former general Rodolfo Gallegos led an uprising there.
Born: Senaida Wirth, baseball player, in Tampa, Florida (d. 1967)

Tuesday, October 5, 1926
The Mikhail Bulgakov play Days of the Turbins premièred at the Moscow Art Theatre.

Wednesday, October 6, 1926
Pennsylvania blue laws from 1794 were invoked in Pittsburgh, banning all Sunday sports in the city of Pittsburgh.

Thursday, October 7, 1926
The early Vitaphone sound-on-disc musical short film A Plantation Act, starring Al Jolson, was released.
Born: Czeslaw Ryll-Nardzewski, mathematician, in Wilno, Second Polish Republic (d. 2015)
Died: Emil Kraepelin, 70, German psychiatrist

Friday, October 8, 1926

German General Hans von Seeckt was forced to resign as head of the Reichswehr after republicans objected to his permitting Prince Wilhelm to take part in military maneuvers in the uniform of the old Imperial First Foot Guards without first getting permission from the government.

Saturday, October 9, 1926
Benito Mussolini made himself the head of Italy's national militia, giving him personal command of all the armed forces in the country.
Born: Ruth Ellis, murderer, in Rhyl, England (d. 1955)

Sunday, October 10, 1926
The St. Louis Cardinals won the 1926 World Series, defeating the New York Yankees in Game 7 by a score of 3–2. The final out of the Series was made by Babe Ruth when he was called out trying to steal second base.
The Kuomintang captured Wuchang after a forty-day siege.
The drama film The Temptress starting Greta Garbo opened.

Monday, October 11, 1926
A brief notice was published in the Soviet newspaper Izvestia announcing that Leon Trotsky, Grigory Zinoviev and Georgy Pyatakov would be placed on trial on October 20 for being overly critical of decisions made at the last Communist Party conference.
The Conservative Party of Canada elected Hugh Guthrie as their new leader. Previous leader Arthur Meighen had resigned after the Conservatives were defeated in the September 14 federal election.
Born: Thích Nhất Hạnh, Buddhist monk, in Huế, French Indochina (d. 2022)
Died: Hymie Weiss, 28, American gangster (shot)

Tuesday, October 12, 1926
The Condé Diamond, a famous rose-coloured diamond that once belonged to the seventeenth century general Louis, Grand Condé, was stolen along with other valuables from the Condé Museum in Chantilly, France. Ladders were used to scale the exterior wall and the gem tower and the glass was cut from the windows.

Wednesday, October 13, 1926
The U.S. Supreme Court ruled that daylight saving time was constitutional. Several Massachusetts labor unions had brought forward a case arguing that it was unconstitutional because the confusion that it caused with train scheduling resulted in pecuniary loss and was "otherwise obnoxious".

Sheikh Hamad ibn Isa Al Khalifa, the Deputy Ruler of Bahrain at the time, survived an assassination attempt as his Hudson car drove on a bridge over a small creek in the village of Sanabis. The perpetrators hid behind a hedge, and were captured after nearly three years of police investigation headed by Haji Sulman bin Jasim and the Amir of Muharraq, Mohamed bin Jabr. They were identified as Hassawis, from the province of Al-Hasa in what is now Saudi Arabia.
Comments from British Labour Party MP Alfred Salter were published in the Daily Express in which he said that drunkenness was a frequent sight in the House of Commons. 
Born: Jesse L. Brown, United States Navy officer, in Hattiesburg, Mississippi (d. 1950); Walter "Killer" Kowalski, professional wrestler, in Windsor, Ontario, Canada (d. 2008); Kazuo Nakamura, Japanese-Canadian painter, in Vancouver, British Columbia (d. 2002); and Eddie Yost, baseball player, in Brooklyn, New York (d. 2012)

Thursday, October 14, 1926
Winnie-the-Pooh by A.A. Milne was published.
In the United Kingdom, H.H. Asquith resigned as leader of the Liberal Party. He was replaced by David Lloyd George.
The F. W. Murnau film Faust had its German premiere at the Ufa-Palast am Zoo in Berlin.

Friday, October 15, 1926
12 police and 35 miners were injured at a mine near Port Talbot, Wales when 500 locked-out miners attacked a colliery that was operating under police protection.
The International Congress of Expert Surveyors convened in Geneva to standardize surveying techniques around the world. 
Born: Michel Foucault, philosopher, in Poitiers, France (d. 1984); Karl Richter, conductor, in Plauen, Germany (d. 1981); and Jean Peters, actress, in East Canton, Ohio (d. 2000)

Saturday, October 16, 1926
The ammunition on the Chinese troopship Kuang Yuang exploded near Kiukiang, China, killing 1,200.
 The Sherlock Holmes short story "The Adventure of the Blanched Soldier" by Sir Arthur Conan Doyle was published for the first time in Liberty magazine in the United States. The story was unusual in that it was narrated by Holmes himself rather than by Dr. Watson.
Died: Princess Frederica of Hanover, 78

Sunday, October 17, 1926
Pope Pius XI beatified 191 Catholic martyrs of the September Massacres during the French Revolution.
The film The Great K & A Train Robbery opened.
Born: Julie Adams, actress, in Waterloo, Iowa (d. 2019); and Beverly Garland, actress, in Santa Cruz, California (d. 2008)

Monday, October 18, 1926

Queen Marie of Romania arrived in New York on the SS Leviathan on the first day of her visit to the United States and Canada. She was welcomed with a ticker tape parade attended by thousands.
Born: Chuck Berry, American rock and roll musician, in St. Louis (d. 2017); Klaus Kinski, actor, in Sopot, Free City of Danzig (d. 1991); and Pauline Pirok, baseball player, in Chicago, Illinois (d. 2020)
Died: James Carroll, 69, New Zealand politician

Tuesday, October 19, 1926
The 1926 Imperial Conference opened in London.
Queen Marie of Romania formally dined at the White House with U.S. President and Mrs. Coolidge.
Died: Victor Babes, Romanian bacteriologist, 72

Wednesday, October 20, 1926
The architect Frank Lloyd Wright was arrested at a cottage in Minnesota where he had been staying with a Montenegrin woman and the daughter they had borne together. They were charged with a state crime of adultery and a federal charge of violating the Mann Act.
More than 650 were killed by a hurricane that hit Cuba.
Ignaz Seipel replaced Rudolf Ramek as Chancellor of Austria.
Died: Eugene V. Debs, 70, American labor and political leader

Thursday, October 21, 1926
Italian Minister of the Interior Luigi Federzoni issued an order forbidding actors on stage from making jokes about the Italian army.
Born: Bob Rosburg, golfer, in San Francisco, California (d. 2009)

Friday, October 22, 1926
In a dressing room of the Princess Theater in Montreal, the illusionist and stunt performer Harry Houdini was forcefully punched several times in the stomach by a McGill University student (accounts differ as to whether Houdini explicitly granted his permission or not). Houdini suffered from severe stomach pains as a result, though it is not clear whether this incident was the cause of his death from appendicitis nine days later as legend would have it.
The adultery charges against Frank Lloyd Wright and his partner were dropped and they were released from Hennepin County Jail on $12,500 bail.
The novel The Sun Also Rises by Ernest Hemingway was published.
The Kars earthquake struck Turkey and Armenia.
Born: Gloria Carter Spann, sister of U.S. President Jimmy Carter, in Plains, Georgia (d. 1990)

Saturday, October 23, 1926

Leon Trotsky and Lev Kamenev were removed from the Politburo of the Central Committee of the Communist Party of the Soviet Union.
Judge Webster Thayer denied the motion for a new trial in the Sacco and Vanzetti murder case, saying the evidence was not sufficient.
The Fazal Mosque, the first purpose-built in London and the first Ahmadiyya mosque in Britain, was completed.

Sunday, October 24, 1926
The radio program The Standard Hour was first broadcast on the NBC Pacific Network.
Harry Houdini gave his final performance at the Garrick Theatre in Detroit.

Monday, October 25, 1926
The U.S. Supreme Court decided Myers v. United States, upholding the President's authority to remove executive appointees without the approval of the Senate.
Born: Galina Vishnevskaya, opera singer, in Leningrad (d. 2012)

Tuesday, October 26, 1926
Queen Marie of Romania's tour entered Canada with visits to Niagara Falls and Hamilton, Ontario. 
British Labour Party MP Alfred Salter was censured in the House of Commons for refusing to retract remarks of his that appeared in the Daily Express. "I am not prepared to withdraw, modify or apologise for anything I have said on this matter, and I propose to repeat the words I made use of and about which complaint has been made", Salter declared. "I said, and I repeat it here to-day, that I have seen members of all parties in this House, my own party I regret to say included, drunk in this House not on one occasion but on many." A motion was passed calling the statement "a gross libel on the Members of this House and a grave breach of its privileges."

Wednesday, October 27, 1926
In a speech made before the American Association of Advertising Agencies and broadcast on the radio, President Calvin Coolidge said that American prosperity was the result of "our high rate of wages which brings about the greatest distribution of wealth that the world has ever seen and provides the enormous capacity for the consumption of all kinds of commodities which characterizes our country." He also said that while wages were high, "that means that the results of prosperity are going more and more into the homes of the land and less into the enrichment of the few, more and more to the men and women and less and less to the capital which is engaged in our economic life. If this were not so the country would not support 20 million automobiles, purchase so many radios, and install so many telephones."

Thursday, October 28, 1926
Pope Pius XI consecrated the first six Chinese bishops since the seventeenth century.
Born: Bowie Kuhn, baseball commissioner, in Takoma Park, Maryland (d. 2007)

Friday, October 29, 1926
A contract was signed between Prussia and the deposed House of Hohenzollern, settling the estates of Wilhelm II. 20 of the 60 formerly royal castles were deemed to be family property, and 32 million marks and 24,000 Dutch guilders were also paid out.
Born: Necmettin Erbakan, Prime Minister of Turkey, in Sinop (d. 2011); and Jon Vickers, tenor, in Prince Albert, Saskatchewan (d. 2015)

Saturday, October 30, 1926
Nicaraguan President Emiliano Chamorro deposited the Presidency upon Senator Sebastián Uriza to serve as a transitional leader until a new government could be elected.
Born: Lois Wyse, advertising executive and author, in Cleveland, Ohio (d. 2007)

Sunday, October 31, 1926
Benito Mussolini survived the fourth attempt on his life in twelve months when 15-year-old anarchist Anteo Zamboni shot at him in Bologna, but missed. Police stood by and allowed a vengeful mob of Fascists to lynch Zamboni on the spot.
The Feast of Christ the King, a new Catholic holy day, was first observed.
Born: Jimmy Savile, DJ and television personality, in Leeds, England (d. 2011)
Died: Harry Houdini, 52, Hungarian-American illusionist and stunt performer; Charles Vance Millar, 72 or 73, Canadian businessman; and Anteo Zamboni, 15, Italian anarchist

References

1926
1926-10
1926-10